Johann "Joe" van Niekerk (born 14 May 1980) is a South African former professional rugby union player who played either as a flanker or number 8.

Career overview 
After starring for the South Africa Schools, under-19, and under-21 sides, and captaining at all three levels, van Niekerk received the rare honour of being called up to the Springboks directly from the U21 side in 2001, in spite of never having played a game in either the Currie Cup or Super 12. He made his debut against the All Blacks in Cape Town.

Van Niekerk has experienced injury troubles throughout his senior-level career. When healthy, however, he is considered able to compete with virtually any back-row player in the world. He scored important tries for the Boks in home wins over the Wallabies in the 2002 Tri Nations Series and the 2004 Tri Nations Series. He has often been used as an "impact player" off the bench, especially in the 2005 Tri Nations Series.

In 2002, he was voted the South African "Player of the Year". In the first match of the 2008 Tri Nations Series against the All Blacks in Wellington, he was a surprise choice to start at No. 8. He was expected to play for the Northampton Saints however his contract was terminated before he arrived, reportedly because of constant injury problems. In May 2013 he played as a replacement as Toulon won the 2013 Heineken Cup Final by 16–15 against Clermont Auvergne. After 2014 Heineken Cup Final van Niekerk has officially retired from rugby union.

Van Niekerk resides in Costa Rica and runs Rama Organica organic farm.

Teams 
South African Schools 1997–1998
South Africa Under-19 1998
South Africa Under-21 2000/2001
South African Sevens 2001
Gauteng Lions U21 1998–2001
Gauteng Lions 2001–2003
Lions Super 12 Team 2002–2003
Stormers Super Rugby Team 2004–2007
Western Province 2004–2007
Springboks 2001–2012
Northampton Saints (contract was terminated before arrival)
Toulon (France) 2008 – 2014

Honours

Toulon
 Heineken Cup: 2013, 2014
 European Challenge Cup runner-up: 2009–10, 2011–12
 Top 14 : 2014
 Top 14 runner-up: 2012, 2013

South Africa
 Tri Nations: 2004

References 
SA Sports Illustrated. "Showdown at ... Quiz Creek: AJ Venter vs Stefan Terblanche." October 2008: 32.

Endnotes

External links 
 
 

1980 births
Living people
Rugby union players from Port Elizabeth
Afrikaner people
South African people of Dutch descent
South African expatriate sportspeople in France
South African rugby union players
South Africa international rugby union players
Golden Lions players
Lions (United Rugby Championship) players
Stormers players
Western Province (rugby union) players
Northampton Saints players
Rugby union flankers
Rugby union number eights
Alumni of King Edward VII School (Johannesburg)
RC Toulonnais players
Expatriate rugby union players in France
South African expatriate rugby union players
South Africa international rugby sevens players
Male rugby sevens players